Andreas Hompland (born 18 September 1946 in Kvinesdal) is a Norwegian social scientist, journalist, magazine editor and non-fiction writer.

Hompland is particularly known for his column Sideblikk, published in the newspaper Dagbladet since 1980. Among his books are Sideblikk på maktmenneske frå Alta til Bergen of 1982, Dynastiet Willoch of 1983, and Trender i arbeidslivet (1999, co-written with K. A. Larsen). He edited the periodical Plan og arbeid from 1984 to 1985, and the periodical Plan from  1994 to 1999.

References

1946 births
Living people
People from Kvinesdal
Norwegian social scientists
Norwegian journalists
Norwegian magazine editors
Norwegian non-fiction writers